Three Years' War may refer to:
 Father Rale's War (1722–1725), between the New England colonies and the Wabanaki Confederacy
 First Schleswig War (1848–1851), between Denmark and Prussia rooted over the Schleswig-Holstein Question
 Gosannen War, fought in the 1080s in Mutsu Province on the Japanese island of Honshū
 Reform War (1858–1860), Mexican civil war between liberals and conservatives over the Constitution of 1857